Sentimento is the ninth studio album released by Andrea Bocelli. It was recorded between 30 September and 7 October 2000, and released on 5 November 2002.

The album was conducted by Lorin Maazel with London Symphony Orchestra, and Bocelli received two 2003 Classical BRIT Awards for "Best selling classical album" and "Album of the year" for Sentimento, in 2003.

As of January 2003, Sentimento has reached worldwide sales of 2.5 million copies.

Track listing

Charts

Weekly charts

Year-end charts

Certifications

References 

 

Andrea Bocelli albums
Decca Records albums
2002 albums